Heinz Siegfried Heydrich (29 September 1905 – 19 November 1944) was the son of Richard Bruno Heydrich and the younger brother of SS-Obergruppenführer Reinhard Heydrich. After the death of his brother in June 1942, Heinz Heydrich helped Jews escape the Holocaust.

Youth

Heinz Heydrich was born in Halle an der Saale to composer Richard Bruno Heydrich, a Protestant, and his wife Elisabeth Anna Maria Amalia Krantz, a Catholic. Her father was Eugen Krantz, director of the Dresden Royal Conservatory.

Heydrich's family held social standing and substantial financial means. The father, Richard Bruno Heydrich, was an opera singer, the founder of a music conservatory in Halle, and a German Nationalist who instilled patriotic ideas in the minds of his three children. The Heydrich household was very strict and the children were frequently disciplined. As a youth, Heydrich engaged his older brother, Reinhard Heydrich, in mock fencing duels.

Career in the SS

Heinz Heydrich was an Obersturmführer (lieutenant), journalist, and publisher of the soldiers' newspaper, Die Panzerfaust. He was at first a fervent admirer of Hitler. But before Reinhard Heydrich's State funeral in Berlin in June 1942, Heinz Heydrich had been given a large packet containing his brother's files, released from his strongbox at Gestapo Headquarters, 8 Prinz-Albrecht-Strasse, Berlin. Heinz had shut himself away in his room with the papers. The next morning, his wife noticed that her husband had sat up all night burning the documents from the package. Heinz, on leave from the front, could not be engaged in conversation, his wife remembered; he seemed to be elsewhere mentally, and like stone. The files in the package were probably Reinhard Heydrich's personal files, from which Heinz Heydrich understood for the first time in all its enormity the systematic extermination of the Jews, the so-called Final Solution. Thereafter, Heinz Heydrich helped many Jews escape by forging identity documents and printing them on Die Panzerfaust presses.

Suicide
When in November 1944 an economic commission headed by a State Attorney investigated the editorial staff of Die Panzerfaust, Heinz Heydrich thought he had been discovered and shot himself in order to protect his family from the Gestapo. In reality, the attorney knew nothing about the forgeries, and was only trying to find out the reason for shortages in paper supplies. According to his nephew Heider, however, Heydrich committed suicide because of a pending court martial case against him for theft and corruption.

Heinz Heydrich is buried in the war cemetery of Riesenburg, according to the Deutsche Dienststelle (WASt).

Family
Heinz Heydrich had five children. His oldest,  (1931–2000), was a well-known German cabaret singer, and wrote a book about his childhood, father, and uncle. In the book, Peter Heydrich describes how, as a youth, he enjoyed the fame of being a "crown prince", as the nephew of Reinhard Heydrich. During boyhood, he thought of his uncle as a successful sportsman and a sensitive musician. In Prague, Peter observed that his uncle had become a "bigwig". Peter derived many privileges from being Reinhard Heydrich's nephew. Even after the war, Peter still felt some pride in the familial relationship, if not so openly. But finally, Peter Heydrich had to admit that Reinhard Heydrich was a devious schemer, who planned and executed important parts of the Holocaust and other crimes. Peter died on 22 November 2000, after a long illness.

See also
 Albert Göring, Hermann Göring's anti-Nazi younger brother
 List of Germans who resisted Nazism

References

German humanitarians
German military personnel who committed suicide
German military writers
Heinz
Nazi-era German officials who resisted the Holocaust
People from Halle (Saale)
People from the Province of Saxony
People who rescued Jews during the Holocaust
SS-Obersturmführer
Suicides by firearm in Germany
Waffen-SS personnel
1905 births
1944 deaths
1944 suicides
Military personnel from Saxony-Anhalt